Outside the Wall can refer to:

Outside the Wall (film), a 1950 film noir crime drama
"Outside the Wall" (song), a 1979 song by Pink Floyd